Ephippiandra is a genus of flowering plants belonging to the family Monimiaceae. Its native range is Madagascar.

Species
Seven species are currently accepted:

Ephippiandra domatiata 
Ephippiandra madagascariensis 
Ephippiandra masoalensis 
Ephippiandra microphylla 
Ephippiandra myrtoidea 
Ephippiandra perrieri 
Ephippiandra tsaratanensis

References

 
Monimiaceae genera
Endemic flora of Madagascar
Taxa named by Joseph Decaisne